The men's marathon event at the 1928 Summer Olympics took place in Amsterdam, Netherlands on Sunday, August 5, 1928. The race started at 15:14 local time. A total number of 57 athletes completed the race, with Willem van der Steen from the Netherlands finishing in last position in 3:29:21. There were 69 competitors from 23 countries. Twelve of them did not finish. The maximum number of athletes per nation was 6. The event was won by Boughera El Ouafi of France, the nation's first Olympic marathon victory since 1900 (and second overall). Manuel Plaza earned Chile's first Olympic marathon medal, while Martti Marttelin's bronze put Finland on the podium in the event for the third straight Games.

Background

This was the eighth appearance of the event, which is one of 12 athletics events to have been held at every Summer Olympics. Returning runners from 1924 included silver medalist Romeo Bertini of Italy, bronze medalist Clarence DeMar of the United States, fifth-place finisher Sam Ferris of Great Britain, sixth-place finisher Manuel Plaza of Chile, seventh-place finisher Boughera El Ouafi of France, and eighth-place finisher Gustav Kinn of Sweden. The field "was very open with no strict favorite."

Latvia, Mexico, Romania, and Yugoslavia each made their first appearance in Olympic marathons. The United States made its eighth appearance, the only nation to have competed in each Olympic marathon to that point.

Competition format

As all Olympic marathons, the competition was a single race. The now-standard marathon distance of 26 miles, 385 yards was run over a course that "started and ended at the Olympic Stadium, but was not strictly out-and-back, as there were small loops near the halfway point, and on the return to the Stadium."

Records

Prior to this competition, the existing world and Olympic records were as follows.

(*) Course was list at 42.75 kilometres.

Schedule

Results

References

External links
 Official Report
  Marathon Info

M
Marathons at the Olympics
Men's marathons
Men's events at the 1928 Summer Olympics